Csillag születik (English: A Star Is Born) is an unlicensed Hungarian version of Got Talent. It launched on RTL Klub on 20 October 2007. Singers, dancers, comedians, variety acts, and other performers compete against each other for audience support.  The winner of the show receives 12 million forint (1 million forint is given to the winner every month for a year) ($50,900/€42,600/£35,300). It is co-hosted by Nóra Ördög and András Stohl. The show has had four seasons so far. 
 
The first season's judges were Sándor Fábry, Mariann Falusi, Tamás Náray, and Andrea Keleti.  The first season was won by Árpád Utasi, comedian.  The second and third season's judges were Szonja Oroszlán, Miklós Fáy, Judit Hernádi and Tamás Szirtes.

On 11 December, Nóra Ördög announced on X-Faktor's ninth week that there would be a third season in 2011. And the second season was won by István Tabáni, singer. The third season was won by Attila László (singer). Tamás Szirtes left the judging panel, after the third series, because he joined the Hungarian version of Dancing with the Stars' judging panel.

The fourth season is aired in 2012 with three new judges, just Judit Hernádi returned from the 2009-2011's judging panel. The judging panel includes Róbert Puzsér (critics man), Judit Hernádi (comedian, actress), András Hajós (singer, comedian) and Lia Pokorny (actress). The winner was János Elek Mészaros, a national songs' singer.

In 2015, RTL Klub started to air its licensed version of Got Talent, titled Hungary's Got Talent.

External links
Official website 
The Talents
Szabó Ádám
Appril Projekt
László Attila
Bad Boyz
Ádok Zoli
Tabáni István
Varga Viktor
Krizbai Teca
Origo.hu 

2007 Hungarian television series debuts
Hungarian television shows
2000s Hungarian television series
Hungarian television series based on British television series
RTL (Hungarian TV channel) original programming